Three Village Central School District is a school district located on Long Island, New York. It serves Setauket, East Setauket, South Setauket, Stony Brook, Poquott, Head of the Harbor, Old Field, and small portions of Port Jefferson, Saint James and Lake Grove. Its name came from the older, original "Three Villages" of Setauket, Stony Brook and Old Field after the merger of the Stony Brook and Setauket school districts in the 1960s. Ward Melville, a local philanthropist, was a proponent of the Three Village school district, and contributed land for its new schools.

The school district is renowned for its InSTAR program, a three-year science research program which produces record numbers of Regeneron Science Talent Search (formerly Intel STS) semifinalists. In 2008, the district's program produced 13 semifinalists, the most semifinalists from a single school in the entire nation.  The district's Intellectually Gifted (I.G.) program is housed at its Nassakeag Elementary School. The Three Village CSD has been represented at nationals for Science Olympiad and by various varsity sports teams.

The current Superintendent of Schools is Dr. Kevin Scanlon.

District history

Notable alumni

Notable alumni of Ward Melville High School include:
 Marco Beltrami (Class of 1984) - professional film composer (Scream)
 Andrew Scheps (Class of 1984) - Grammy winning record producer/engineer (U2, Red Hot Chili Peppers, Johnny Cash)
 Howard S. Berger (Class of 1982) - avant garde film-maker
 Greg Cattrano (Class of 1993) - MLL goalie for the Baltimore Bayhawks
 Frances Conroy (Class of 1971) - actress (Six Feet Under)
 Eric Corley (Class of 1978) - Writer, founder of 2600: the hacker quarterly, Director of freedom downtime
 Chris Dieterich (Class of 1976) - NFL lineman for the Detroit Lions, 1980–86
 Michael R. Douglas (Class of 1979) - worldwide leading string theorist
 Brooke Ellison (Class of 1996) - the first quadriplegic to graduate from Harvard University
 Mick Foley (Class of 1983) - professional wrestler and author
 John Fugelsang (Class of 1987) - host of America's Funniest Home Videos, 1997–2000
 Jarrod Gorbel (Class of 1993) - indie singer-songwriter
 Kevin James (Class of 1983) - comedian/actor (The King of Queens).
 Brian MacDevitt (Class of 1973) - world-renowned tap dancer and four-time Tony Award-winning lighting designer
 Burton Rocks (Class of 1990)- bestselling author, sports attorney/agent
 Todd Sauerbrun (Class of 1991) - retired NFL punter who played for the Chicago Bears, Kansas City Chiefs, Carolina Panthers, and then finally the Denver Broncos 1995–2007.
 Joe Silipo - Former professional football player
 Gary Valentine (Class of 1979) - comedian (The King of Queens)
 Joyce Yang (Class of 2004) - Concert Pianist; Silver Medalist, 2005 Van Cliburn International Piano Competition.
 Steven Matz (Class of 2009) - Left-Handed Pitcher for the New York Mets
 Anthony Kay (Class of 2013) - Left-Handed Pitcher for the Toronto Blue Jays

Schools
High School (Grades 10-12):
 Ward Melville High School
Middle Schools (Grades 7- 9):
Robert Cushman Murphy Junior High School
Paul J. Gelinas Junior High School
Elementary Schools (Grades K-6):
Setauket Elementary School
Minnesauke Elementary School
Nassakeag Elementary School
Arrowhead Elementary School
William Sidney Mount Elementary School
North Country School (Closed in 1980)
Christian Avenue School (Grades K-1) (Closed in 1976)

Administration
Dr. Kevin Scanlon is currently the Superintendent of Schools.
 Dr. Brian Biscari, Assistant Superintendent for Education Services
 Dr. Gary Dabrusky, Assistant Superintendent for Human Resources
 Mr. Jeffrey Carlson, Deputy Superintendent
 Mr. James o'Hagan Director of Maintenance & Operations
 Ms. Jean P. Ecker, Director of Child Nutrition
 Ms. Catherine Taldone, Director of School/Community Partnerships and SACC

Board of education
Current Board of Education members (with term expiration dates in parentheses) are:
 Mr. William F. Connors Jr. (2021)
 Mr. Jonathan Kornreich (2019)
 Ms. Angelique Ragolia (2019)
 Ms. Deanna Bavlnka (2021)
 Ms. Irene Gische (2020)
 Dr. Jeffrey Kerman (2020)
 Ms. Inger Germano (2020)

References

External links
 
 
 

Three Village Central School District Schools
Education in Suffolk County, New York